Film Movement is a North American distributor of independent and foreign films, which is based in New York City, founded in 2003.

History
Film Movement was founded in 2003, and has released more than 250 feature films and shorts. Having grown from a DVD-of-the-month club, Film Movement's theatrical distribution strategy has evolved to include American independent films, documentaries, and foreign arthouse titles. Its catalog includes titles by directors such as Ryusuke Hamaguchi, Hirokazu Kore-eda, Maren Ade, Jessica Hausner, Andrei Konchalovsky, Andrzej Wajda, Diane Kurys, Ciro Guerra, and Mélanie Laurent.

In 2015, Film Movement launched its reissue label Film Movement Classics, featuring new restorations released theatrically as well as on Blu-ray and DVD, including films by such noted directors as Ang Lee, Éric Rohmer, Peter Greenaway, Bille August, Marleen Gorris, Takeshi Kitano, Arturo Ripstein, and Ettore Scola.

In January 2019, Film Movement acquired the reissue rights to seven films for its classics label, including Heroes Shed No Tears by John Woo and The Reflecting Skin starring Viggo Mortensen. And in 2020, it acquired the North American right to American Thief, an action thriller film directed by Miguel Silveira.

Selected titles
Wheel of Fortune and Fantasy
Playground (2021 film)
Dead Pigs
After the Storm
Theeb
Human Capital
The Ardennes
Oh Lucy!
The Dynamiter

References

External links
 Filmmovement website
 Canadian website (closed 2015) at the Wayback Machine
 2009 article by Roger Ebert at the Wayback Machine

Online mass media companies of the United States
Companies based in New York City
Entertainment companies established in 2003